"My Weakness Is None of Your Business" is a song by English rock band Embrace, the band's fifth single release. It was released on 17 August 1998 and became the third top-ten single from their debut album, The Good Will Out (1998), peaking at number nine on the UK Singles Chart, but it dropped out of the top 40 the next week.

CD2 contains three songs from the album performed live at Abbey Road Studios, and is part of an EP of songs recorded live during the "Abbey Road Sessions" that was released the same year.

Track listings

Charts

References

1998 singles
1998 songs
Embrace (English band) songs
Hut Records singles
Songs written by Danny McNamara
Songs written by Richard McNamara